Sara Goodrum is Director of Player Development for the Houston Astros. She is the first woman to  hold the position of minor league hitting coordinator for a Major League Baseball team the position she held prior for the Milwaukee Brewers.

Playing career 
Goodrum played softball for the University of Oregon from 2012–15, during which the Ducks appeared in the Women's College World Series three times. She played in the outfield, appearing in 33 games in 2014, her junior year, when she was also named to the Academic All-Pac-12 Second Team.

Coaching career 
While at Oregon, Goodrum worked as an undergraduate research assistant at the Bowerman Sports Science Clinic. After graduating with a degree in human physiology, she earned a master's degree in exercise and sports science from the University of Utah.

She started with the Brewers as an intern in April 2017. She also worked as coordinator for integrative sports performance before being promoted in October 2020 to being the Minor League hitting coordinator, which the team announced in January 2021. As hitting coordinator, she oversees the hitting curriculum and programming for all players in the Brewers' minor league system and manages the organization's minor league hitting coaches. On December 1, 2021, the Houston Astros hired Goodrum to serve as their director of player development.

Personal 
Goodrum is from Mesa, Arizona.

References 

Milwaukee Brewers coaches
American sportswomen
Sportspeople from Mesa, Arizona
Oregon Ducks softball players
University of Utah alumni
Year of birth missing (living people)
Living people
Softball players from Arizona
Baseball coaches from Arizona